Alexandre Giroux (born June 16, 1981) is a Canadian ice hockey forward currently playing for the Thetford Assurancia of the Quebec-based Ligue Nord-Américaine de Hockey. He previously played in the National League (NL) with HC Ambrì-Piotta and EHC Kloten. He is the son of former World Hockey Association player Rejean Giroux.

Playing career

Amateur
As a youth, Giroux played in the 1995 Quebec International Pee-Wee Hockey Tournament with a minor ice hockey team from Quebec City.

Giroux joined the QMJHL's Hull Olympiques in 1998–99 and went on to play parts of three seasons with the club before joining the Rouyn-Noranda Huskies midway through the 2000–01 season. Over the course of his junior career, Giroux registered 226 points (111 goals and 115 assists) before going on to make his professional debut with the AHL's Grand Rapids Griffins in 2001–02.

Professional
Drafted by the Ottawa Senators in 1999, Giroux failed to crack the NHL roster. He would spend parts of three seasons in the Senators' system before a 2004 deadline deal sent him and Karel Rachunek to the New York Rangers for Greg de Vries. Giroux would ultimately play only one game with the Rangers, spending the majority of his time with their farm team, the Hartford Wolf Pack. In the summer of 2006, Giroux signed as a free agent with the Washington Capitals. As a member of the Capitals, Giroux would spend the majority of his time with the club's AHL affiliate, the Hershey Bears and appear in a handful of games with Washington. The following summer, he signed as a free agent with the Atlanta Thrashers. With the Thrashers, Giroux was sent to the club's AHL affiliate, the Chicago Wolves. He tallied 19 goals and 41 points in 44 games with the Wolves before he was traded back to the Capitals organization.

On August 5, 2009, it was announced that Giroux had signed a one-year two-way contract to remain with the Hershey Bears. The 2008–09 AHL season was a successful one for Giroux. On January 18, 2009, Giroux broke Brett Hull's American Hockey League record for consecutive games scoring a goal, scoring in 15 straight games. On April 10, 2009, Giroux capped off his memorable season by being awarded the Les Cunningham Award as American Hockey League MVP.

On July 3, 2010, he signed a one-year deal with the Edmonton Oilers. Following their preseason run, he was assigned to the Oilers' AHL affiliates, the Oklahoma City Barons. With a season-ending injury to the Oilers' Taylor Hall, Giroux was recalled from Oklahoma City, on March 5, 2011. He made his Oilers debut the same night, scoring a goal which helped Edmonton secure a 5–1 victory, over the Colorado Avalanche.

On July 3, 2011, Giroux signed a two-way contract with the Columbus Blue Jackets. During the 2011–12 season, Giroux appeared in 9 games with the Blue Jackets but primarily was assigned to the all familiar AHL with the Springfield Falcons.

On May 24, 2012, Giroux left North America and inked a one-year deal as a free agent with Dinamo Riga of the Kontinental Hockey League. In the 2012–13 season with the Latvian outfit, Giroux failed to produce the desired offensive impact, with 21 points in 47 games, before he was loaned to Swiss club, the Kloten Flyers of the NLA to end the campaign.

In the following season, Giroux remained in Switzerland, signing an initial one-year contract with HC Ambrì-Piotta of the National League A (NLA) on June 28, 2013. During his three-year stint, he saw the ice in 167 NLA contests, tallying 77 goals and 56 assists.

Giroux returned to the KHL upon the conclusion of the 2015-16 season, penning a deal with Medvescak Zagreb in July 2016.

In 11 AHL seasons, Giroux totaled 704 points in 771 games. His 368 goals are seventh-most in league history.

Career statistics

Awards and honours 
AHL MVP (2008-09)
AHL scoring champion (2008-09)
AHL goal-scoring champion (2008-09, 2009-10)
AHL First All-Star Team (2008-09, 2009-10, 2010–11)
Calder Cup champion (2009, 2010)
AHL All-Star Classic (2007, 2009, 2010, 2011)

References

External links

1981 births
Living people
HC Ambrì-Piotta players
Binghamton Senators players
Canadian ice hockey defencemen
Chicago Wolves players
Columbus Blue Jackets players
Dinamo Riga players
Edmonton Oilers players
Grand Rapids Griffins players
Hartford Wolf Pack players
Hershey Bears players
Hull Olympiques players
Ice hockey people from Quebec City
EHC Kloten players
KHL Medveščak Zagreb players
New York Rangers players
Oklahoma City Barons players
Ottawa Senators draft picks
Rouyn-Noranda Huskies players
Springfield Falcons players
Washington Capitals players
Canadian expatriate ice hockey players in Croatia
Canadian expatriate ice hockey players in Latvia
Canadian expatriate ice hockey players in Switzerland